No Brain is a South Korean punk rock band widely considered one of the godfathers of the Korean punk scene. Originally part of Korea's homegrown underground punk movement, known as Chosun Punk, in recent years the group has enjoyed mainstream success both with their music and their emerging acting and hosting careers. Their name comes from their desire for concert-goers to leave their rational minds at the venue doors.

History
The group formed in 1996 in a small club in Hongdae (an artistic district of Seoul). They are part of the first generation of indie bands in Korea, along with Crying Nut. Their first album, Our Nation Volume 2, was a split album with the group Weeper. They also contributed a cover of "Lithium" to the Nirvana tribute album Smells Like Nirvana, and several tracks to the Korean punk compilation Here We Stand.

In 1999, they left Drug Records, establishing their own label, Munwha Sagidan. They only printed 5000 copies of their first release, the EP Youth 98, and all were sold out.

In 2000, bassist Jeong Jaehwan left the group in order to carry out his mandatory military service, but the group pressed on without him. The same year, the band dubbed itself the anti-Seo Taiji band and held a live event to commemorate the occasion.

April 2001 found the group releasing a song-for-song cover of the Sex Pistols album Never Mind The Bollocks Here's The Sex Pistols, dubbed Never Mind The Sex Pistols Here's The No Brain. Several months later, the group released the album Viva No Brain. The group then performed at the 2001 Fuji Rock Festival in Japan. The group created something of international incident when Lee Sung Woo, the lead singer of the group, ripped up the Japanese Imperial flag while singing the Korean national anthem.

The band contributed a track to the Red Devils 2002 World Cup album. The band also embarked on a national club tour in Korea and a tour of Japan. That same year, Cha Seung-woo left the group. The group recruited Jeong Minjun, formerly of the bands Real Sshang Noms and Samchung, and recorded the album Goodbye, Mary Poppins which was released in June 2003. 
This 3rd album was a big change and challenge for No Brain, beginning the band's second era. Overall, this album was a turning point for the band.

In 2006 they appeared in the film Radio Star, portraying a garage band named East River.

In 2007, No Brain sold the rights to their song "넌 내게 반했어" (You have a crush on me) to be used by the presidential campaign for Lee Myung-bak with the substituted title "이번엔 이명박" (This time Lee Myung-bak). Although No Brain did not endorse Lee's presidential campaign, they faced much backlash from fans. The reaction was especially exasperated, as in 2005, then-Mayor of Seoul Lee had previously called for a blacklist of independent musicians.

In 2013, No Brain performed at SXSW. They toured North America as part of the Seoulsonic 2K13 tour funded by KOCCA alongside Goonam and Lowdown 30, performing in Rhode Island, New York, and California, as well as Toronto, Canada for Canadian Music Week (CMW). Their performance at CMW was seen by record producer Seymour Stein. Surprised by his interest, the band invited him to their next performance in Brooklyn. The show was delayed for two hours, and the 71-year-old Stein fell asleep, only to be woken up when their performance began. No Brain signed a recording contract with Stein to release an album on Sire Records. Stein visited No Brain in Korea for the Seoul International Music Fair (Mu:Con). The album, produced by Julian Raymond, is set to be their first English album.

The same year, No Brain also headlined the V-Rox Festival in Vladivostok, Russia.

Band members
 Bulldaegal  – vocals
 VOVO  – guitar
 BBogle  – bass guitar
 Hyoonga  – drums

Awards and honors
 2008 Korean Music Awards - Netizens Choice: Rock Artist of the Year
 2007 Korean Music Awards - Band of the Year
 2007 Korean Music Awards - Rock Song of the Year - Nominee
 2005 Ministry of Patriots and Veterans Affairs - Culture Award
 2001 Mnet Asian Music Awards Professional Judges Special
 Nominated: 2001 Mnet Asian Music Awards - Best Indie Performance - "Go To The Beach" (해변으로 가요)
 Nominated: 2000 Mnet Asian Music Awards - Best Indie Performance - "Songs for the Rioters" (청년폭도맹진가)
 1999 MTV International Viewer's Choice Award - Korea - Nominee

Discography
 Here We Stand (Asian punk compilation) 1997, All System Fail  
 Smells Like Nirvana 1997, Drug Records
 Our Nation 2 1998, Drug Records split with Weeper
 Youth 98 1999, Munwha Sagidan
 Songs for the Rioters 2000, Cujo/Munwha Sagidan/Pony Canyon Korea
 Never Mind the Sex Pistols. Here's the No Brain 2001, Cujo, Munwha Sagidan
 Viva No Brain 2001, Cujo/Munwha Sagidan
 Christmas Punk compilation, 2001, Cujo/Munwha Sagidan
 Munwha Sagidan Compilation 2002, Cujo/Munwha Sagidan
 Dreams Come True, compilation with Crying Nut, YB, etc. 2002, Red Devils/Jave
 The Blue Hearts Super Tribute tribute compilation to Japanese band The Blue Hearts
 Goodbye, Mary Poppins 2003, Cujo
 Stand Up Again 2004, Rockstar Music
 Songs to be sung again 2005, Egg Music/Ministry of Patriots' & Veterans' Affairs
 Boys, Be Ambitious 2005, Rockstar Music
 Shout out, Korea! 2005, Rockstar Music
 That is Youth 2007, Rockstar Music
 Dragon Fighter 2007, Rockstar Music for the TV show Seoul Martial Arts
 Absolutely Summer 2009, Rockstar Music
 We Wish You a Merry Christmas digital single, 2009, Rockstar Music 
 Soldiers of Korea single for World Cup 2010, Rockstar Music 
 High Tension 2011, Rockstar Music
 Super High Tension, 2013, Roxtamuzik & Live
 96 [2014], split album with Crying Nut
 Brainless 2016, Roxtamuzik & Live
 20, 20th Anniversary, 2016, Roxtamuzik & Live
 직진, 2019, Roxtamuzik & Live

References

External links 

  

South Korean punk rock groups
South Korean indie rock groups
Musical groups established in 1996
South Korean rock music groups
MAMA Award winners
Korean Music Award winners